Gerardo Jiménez Sánchez (born April 21, 1965) is a Mexican-born pediatrician, scientist and businessman. Along with David Valle and Barton Childs, he completed the first medical analysis of the human genome. He was founder and director of the first National Institute of Genomic Medicine in Latin America (INMEGEN) and leader of the team that developed the Genomic Map of the Mexican Population.

Biography

Jiménez Sánchez was born in Mexico City in 1965. He is the son of agricultural scientist Leobardo Jiménez and plant biochemist Estela Sánchez, both Mexican national emeritus investigators. He obtained a medical degree at the National Autonomous University of Mexico (UNAM) School of Medicine and did his residency in pediatrics at the National Institute of Pediatrics. He obtained a PhD in Human Genetics and Molecular Biology at Johns Hopkins University. His postgraduate training included studies at Duke University. He specialized in Senior Business Management (AD2), Business on Innovation and Technology (ADIT), and Management Business by Services at the IPADE Business School.

He was president of the Working Party on Biotechnology at the Organization for Economic Cooperation and Development (OECD) (2006-2013) and is currently President of the Committee on Genomics and Bioeconomy at the Human Genome Organization  (HUGO), where he served as a member of the Board of Directors from 2007 to 2014. He is Executive President of Global Biotech Consulting Group (GBC Group), which advises on the development of biotechnological projects in areas such as genomic medicine, the pharmacogenomics, pharmaceutical industry, and the development of bio-based businesses.

Jimenez-Sanchez is Executive President of Medical Genomics, President of the Board of Directors at Genómica y Bioeconomía A.C. and Professor of Genomics and Bioeconomics at the School of Public Health at Harvard University. Along with Guillermo Soberón, Julio Frenk, Jorge Carpizo y Diego Valadés he founded Genómica y Bioeconomía A.C., a non-for-profit organization where he serves as chairman of the board. He was named Chief Scientific Officer for BioFields  in 2010.

Jimenez-Sanchez was a member of the Advisory Board on Biotechnology to the General Secretary of the United Nations, Kofi Annan, President of the I and II National Congresses of Genomic Medicine in Mexico (first in its kind in Latin America, and among the first world-wide), and in 2013 he served as president of the International Forum “Genomics, Innovation, and Economic Growth”.

He was the first President of the Mexican Society of Genomic Medicine in Mexico in 2004. He received the Silanes award in Genomic Medicine in 2003, and in the same year, he was distinguished with the Gold Master of the Top Management Forum chaired by King Juan Carlos I of Spain. In 1997, he joined the New York Academy of Sciences.

Jiménez-Sánchez is a member of the Mexican Society of Genomic Sciences (Mexico) (2004), the Mexican Pediatric Society, Mexico (2000), the American Society of Gene Therapy, USA (1999), Latin American Society of Inborn Metabolic Errors (1998), the Society for Inherited Metabolic Disorders, USA (1998), the American Society of Human Genetics, USA (1997), the Latin American Society of Human Genetics, USA (1990), the Society for the Study of Inborn Errors of Metabolism, United Kingdom (1990), the Mexican Association of Human Genetics, México (1988), the Mexican Society of Biochemistry, México (1986).

In addition to his multiple scientific publications, his work has been featured by CNN, USA Today, Reforma, and Radio France International.

References

Johns Hopkins University alumni
National Autonomous University of Mexico alumni
Scientists from Mexico City
1965 births
Living people